The 44th Artillery Brigade is an artillery formation of the Ukrainian Ground Forces, based in Ternopil.

Current Structure 
As of 2017 the brigade's structure is as follows:

 44th Artillery Brigade, Ternopil
 Headquarters & Headquarters Battery
 1st Howitzer Artillery Battalion (2A65 Msta-B)
 2nd Howitzer Artillery Battalion (2A36 Hyacinth-B)
 3rd Howitzer Artillery Battalion (2A36 Hyacinth-B)
 4th Self-propelled Artillery Battalion (2S7 Pion)
 5th Anti-tank Artillery Battalion (MT-12 Rapira)
 Artillery Reconnaissance Battalion
 6th Motorized Infantry Battalion "Zbruch"
 Engineer Company
 Maintenance Company
 Logistic Company
 CBRN-defense Platoon
 Band of the 44th Artillery Brigade

In May 2016, soldiers from the Band of the 44th Artillery Brigade performed Shche ne vmerla Ukraina nearly 300 metres underground, breaking a world record.

References

Artillery brigades of Ukraine
Military units and formations established in 2014